Lisa Jean Kubiske (born March 21, 1954) is an American diplomat; from July 2011 to August 2014 she was the United States Ambassador to Honduras.

Kubiske is currently (2014–present) the Deputy Assistant Secretary for International Finance and Development at the State Department under the Bureau of Economic and Business Affairs.

She was forced to retire from the Foreign Service in 2017 as part of the Trump Administration program to cut the size of the diplomatic corps by one-third.

Background
Kubiske graduated from Brandeis University with a BA in anthropology and psychology, and from Georgetown University with a Masters of Science in Foreign Service (MSFS).  She spent a junior year abroad at Pontificia Universidad Católica del Perú.

She was the director of the Office of Regional Economic Policy and Summit Coordination, in the Bureau of Western Hemisphere Affairs. She also served as Deputy Chief of Mission of the United States Mission in Brazil.

Family
She is married to freelance journalist Dan Kubiske; they have two sons. Kubiske also has one stepdaughter and one granddaughter.

Notes

External links
"A bio-fuels ambassador: Obama names new ambassador to Honduras", April 18, 2011, Annie Bird
Lisa J. Kubiske at the Office of the Historian website.

United States Department of State officials
Ambassadors of the United States to Honduras
Living people
1954 births
Brandeis University alumni
Walsh School of Foreign Service alumni
American women ambassadors